This is a list of films produced by the Ollywood film industry based in Bhubaneshwar and Cuttack in 2006:

A-Z

References

2006
Ollywood
2000s in Orissa
2006 in Indian cinema